Gierach is a surname. Notable people with the surname include:

Gretchen Gierach, American epidemiologist and women's health researcher
John Gierach (born 1946), American author and freelance writer

See also
Gierasch

Polish-language surnames